The 1994 UNLV Rebels football team was an American football team that represented the University of Nevada, Las Vegas in the Big West Conference during the 1994 NCAA Division I-A football season. In their first year under head coach Jeff Horton, the team compiled a 7–5 record.

Schedule

References

UNLV
UNLV Rebels football seasons
Big West Conference football champion seasons
Las Vegas Bowl champion seasons
UNLV Rebels football